Madison Municipal Airport may refer to:

 Madison Municipal Airport (Georgia) in Madison, Georgia, United States (FAA: 52A)
 Madison Municipal Airport (Indiana) in Madison, Indiana, United States (FAA:IMS)
 Madison Municipal Airport (South Dakota) in Madison, South Dakota, United States (FAA: MDS)

See also 
 Madison Airport (disambiguation)
 Madison County Airport (disambiguation)